The 2012 season saw Somerset County Cricket Club competing in three domestic competitions; the first division of the County Championship in which despite the squad being ravaged with injuries they finished as runners-up, the Clydesdale Bank 40 but a poor start meant they finished third in their group, and the county reached the semi-finals of the Friends Life t20.

Squad
The following players made at least one appearance for Somerset in First-class, List A or Twenty20 cricket in 2012.  Age given is at the start of Somerset's first match of the season (31 March 2012).

Pre-season

Match log

County Championship

Season standings
Note: Pld = Played, W = Wins, L = Losses, D = Draws, T = Ties, A = Abandonments, Bat = Batting points, Bwl = Bowling points, Adj = Adjustments/Penalties, Pts = Points.

Match log

Batting averages

Bowling averages

Clydesdale Bank 40

Season standings
Note: Pld = Played, W = Wins, L = Losses, T = Ties, NR = No result, Pts = Points, NRR = Net run rate.

Match logs

Batting averages

Bowling averages

Friends Life t20

Season standings
Note: Pld = Played, W = Wins, L = Losses, T = Ties, NR = No result, Pts = Points, NRR = Net run rate.

Knockout stages

Match logs

Batting averages

Bowling averages

Tourist match

Match log

Statistics

Batting

Bowling

Fielding

Wicket-keeping

References

2012 in English cricket
Somerset County Cricket Club seasons